Isabel Greenberg is a British graphic novelist and illustrator. Her first book, The Encyclopedia of Early Earth, was published in 2013 by Jonathan Cape in the UK, Little Brown in the US and Random House in Canada.

Career

Greenberg has been published in The Guardian, The Observer, The New York Times and Nobrow Press.

In 2013, she was one of 20 leading graphic designers and illustrators to feature in the Memory Palace exhibition at the V & A, sponsored by Sky Arts. An original piece of fiction by Hari Kunzru was transformed into a "walk-in graphic novel".

In 2014, she was a select at Pick Me Up at Somerset House.

She has worked with Chatham Dockyard, Tyntesfield House and The Museum of Marco Polo.

The Observer/Cape/Comica Graphic Short Story Prize
Greenberg first entered the prize in 2009, when she came second.

She entered again in 2011 and won with Love in a Very Cold Climate, a love story about a Nord, a north-pole dweller, and a Suit, a south-pole dweller, who can never touch.

Graphic novels
Greenberg's first graphic novel, The Encyclopedia of Early Earth (2013), is a series of interlinking stories set in Early Earth, where her prize-winning short story was also set. Rachel Cooke, reviewing her book in The Guardian, said "her wonderful book already feels like a classic" and compared her to Tove Jansson. It has been translated into German, Spanish, French and Polish.

In 2016, Greenberg released her second graphic novel, The One Hundred Nights of Hero.

In Glass Town (2020), parts of the Brontë juvenilia are retold and intersected with the lives of four Brontë children — Charlotte, Branwell, Emily and Anne, as they explore the paracosm they created. James Smart, for The Guardian, wrote: "Greenberg blurs fiction and memoir: characters walk between worlds and woo their creators. [...] This is a tale, bookended by funerals, about the collision between dreamlike places of possibility and constrained 19th-century lives".

Children's books 
Greenberg has also illustrated several children's books. The book A Hundred Billion Trillion Stars with Seth Fishman won the 2018 Mathical Book Prize.

Personal life
Greenberg attended Brighton School of Art, studying illustration.

Greenberg currently lives in London, England.

References

British illustrators
British graphic novelists
British female comics artists
Artists from London
Living people
Alumni of the University of Brighton
Female comics writers
Year of birth missing (living people)